The men's 200 metres event at the 1986 Commonwealth Games was held on 28 and 31 July at the Meadowbank Stadium in Edinburgh.

Medalists

Results

Heats
Qualification: First 4 of each heat (Q) and the next 4 fastest (q) qualified for the semifinals.

Wind:Heat 1: +0.9 m/s, Heat 2: +0.3 m/s, Heat 3: +1.6 m/s

Semifinals
Qualification: First 4 of each semifinal qualified directly (Q) for the final.

Wind:Heat 1: +1.6 m/s, Heat 2: +2.6 m/s

Final
Wind: +2.2 m/s

References

Athletics at the 1986 Commonwealth Games
1986